Šmihel nad Mozirjem is a settlement in the Municipality of Mozirje in northern Slovenia. It lies below the Golte Hills north of Mozirje. The area is part of the traditional region of Styria. The municipality is now included in the Savinja Statistical Region.

Name
The name of the settlement was changed from Šmihel to Šmihel nad Mozirjem in 1955.

Church
The parish church from which the settlement gets its name is dedicated to Saint Michael and belongs to the Roman Catholic Diocese of Celje. It dates to the 17th century.

References

External links
Šmihel nad Mozirjem on Geopedia

Populated places in the Municipality of Mozirje